Viktor Valeryevich Brovchenko (born 11 October 1976) is a former Ukrainian football player.

Club career
Brovchenko played one season in the Russian Premier League with FC Lokomotiv Nizhny Novgorod.

References

1976 births
Footballers from Vinnytsia
Living people
Ukrainian footballers
Ukrainian expatriate footballers
Association football midfielders
Budapesti VSC footballers
FC Lokomotiv Nizhny Novgorod players
FC Karpaty Lviv players
FC Nyva Vinnytsia players
FC Epitsentr Dunaivtsi players
FC Sovignon Tayirove players
Liaoning F.C. players
Expatriate footballers in Hungary
Expatriate footballers in China
Russian Premier League players
Chinese Super League players
FC Torpedo Moscow players
FC Torpedo-2 players
FC Novokuznetsk players
Ukrainian expatriate sportspeople in Hungary
Ukrainian expatriate sportspeople in China